Marchese Carlo Ginori (1702–1757), Italian politician (Tuscany) and founder of the Doccia porcelain factory in Sesto Fiorentino, near Florence, Italy. He pioneered the development of porcelain production, contemporary with Meissen, in mid-eighteenth-century Europe. Ginori's  porcelain was collected by Medicis and most of the nobility of Europe. Napoleon's wife, Marie Louise of Austria, ordered an enormous service set that survives to this day. 

The 16th century passion for oriental pottery, which was imported into Europe at great expense, and affordable only by a few of the very wealthiest families, led the Medici to found the first European porcelain factory in Florence. That short lived venture was followed in 1737 with the founding of Ginori factory at Doccia.

References

External links
Eighteenth-century Italian porcelain, a book from The Metropolitan Museum of Art Libraries (fully available online as PDF), which contains material on Carlo Ginori

Italian politicians
1702 births
1757 deaths